is a Japanese anime television series produced by Diomedéa, directed by Tsutomu Mizushima and written by Mari Okada, with character designs by Naomi Ide and music by Masaru Yokoyama. The series began airing on April 2, 2016, and finished airing on June 18, 2016. The title, originally stands for a Japanese folklore.

Plot
A group of 30 young men and women go on a bus tour to Nanaki Village, a shadowy village with an urban legend of being a utopia. Many seek either to start a new life or escape the troubles of their old one. Upon arrival, they discover the village has no inhabitants, with small signs of life that are slowly deteriorating. The truth of Nanaki Village has yet to be discovered.

Characters

A seemingly naïve, gullible and optimistic boy who joined the Nanakimura Village tour because he was tired of his overprotective and emotionally abusive mother. Because he attended an all-boys school, he rarely talks to girls and fears that he falls in love and gets manipulated too easily by other people. During his childhood, his twin brother Tokimune was killed in an accident and he had to take his name to help his mentally unstable mother recover. Ever since then, he's felt that his identity has been locked away.

A mysterious and emotional girl on the tour whom Mitsumune takes upon himself to defend. When she was young she created an invisible character in her mind named "Reiji" to be her close friend and buddy with whom she could chat and spend time with. However, when she realized that she was the only one who could see and interact with Reiji, she started secluding and doubting herself. When she heard rumors about a village which can make your trauma take form and appear, she visits Nanakimura Village to ascertain herself that Reiji was real and to actually meet him. However, during the last episode Reiji appears as her Nanaki and explains to her that he was nothing more than a figment of her imagination created as a means of filling the loneliness inside her. Unable to accept reality, Masaki flees the area whilst Reiji tells Mitsumune to chase after her. When Mitsumune catches up to Masaki he tells her that he will take Reiji's place in her heart and be with her so she could share all her thoughts and feelings with him. Blushing upon these words she is finally able to accept that Reiji was an illusion, causing him to disappear from Nanakimura Village. Masaki is then finally able to leave alongside Mitsumune. It is implied that after the events of the series, Masaki and Mitsumune started dating.

Mitsumune's best friend who joined under the handle of Speedstar. He's calm, aloof, and pragmatic. He defended Mitsumune from bullies in school and reminds him to do whatever he tells him to avoid getting into trouble or standing out too much, acting as a defender for Mitsumune in return for his friendship. In actuality, Hayato is deeply possessive of Mitsumune, doing everything in his power to reinforce the idea that Mitsumune needs him due to his own feelings of powerlessness after years of physical and emotional abuse from his parents, who would beat and lock him up in their attic with a picture of his grandmother, who had died there after her senility began hurting the family's public image. He hates Masaki as he believes she is "seducing" Mitsumune away from him and even tries to murder her on one occasion to remove her from Mitsumune's life. He, unlike Mitsumune, joined the tour because he thinks that Nanakimura Village is just a hoax and wanted to prove it.

A woman working for the First Life Do-Over Tour who used much folklore, mythology and a mysterious email to pinpoint the location of the fabled Nanakimura Village.

An aggressive, determined, and stubborn man who takes it upon himself to keep the others in check. He is trying to escape his life in which he was made a scapegoat by the company he worked for. Despite claiming he intends to never take all the responsibility for a failure again he keeps putting himself into leadership positions in which he very well might.

A quite and mysterious young girl in a yellow hoodie, she claims to be capable of seeing when people will die. She's very suspicious of Mitsumune, believing him to be a danger, and views everyone on the trip as being psychological powder kegs. Her distrust towards others is a result of the fact her mother abused her power in order to get rich quickly, using her ability to predict if someone is dying and forcing them to buy her expensive charms.

A girl obsessed with execution who claims to have joined the tour to protect her identity. Her obsession for execution comes from her traumatic childhood, where she and her mother would often be beaten up by her mother's monk lover, whom her mother only met to pay off the huge debts left behind by Lovepon's father.

A girl betrayed by her friends and boyfriend and wanted to go somewhere new to start fresh. She flirts with and teases Mitsumune because he reminds her of her ex-boyfriend, but she is infuriated when he tells her that he's not interested in her.

A woman that claims to be a famous private investigator. While in Nanakimura she puts her deductive and detective skills to use.

A quiet and mysterious boy with a violent past. His actual name is "Sasaki" and he was a childhood friend of Maimai. He was sent to a juvenile detention center after stabbing one of his classmates. The reason he attacked the classmate was because he was suffering from constant bullying and eventually snapped. When Hyōketsu no Judgeness was constantly pestering him about the similar Japanese characters in their names and accusing him of copying his name, he attacks him with a garden hoe. The others subdue him and imprison him within a cell they found in the village. However, he later escapes and is only seen briefly when most of the members of the tour try to leave the village.

A meticulous and calculating man who claims to have worked for a trading company. He admits to being an "elite", having expected to inherit his parents' business, get married and settle down. He claims to have joined the tour because he was tired of treading the beaten path. In actuality, he was an engineer for a toy company who destroyed his career and reputation after a toy train he had staked everything on failed miserably due to a minor oversight on his part. He slowly becomes more and more unhinged over the course of the series, eventually going rogue with Lovepon to murder Masaki.

A man who wears an eyepatch and a 20,000 yen suit, he claims to have made peace with the world and warns others not to get too close to him. However, he is just putting on a persona to make him seem tougher than he really is. In English, his name stands for "Judgement of freeze".

A gun enthusiast who claims to have joined the tour so she could shoot things and people wouldn't complain as much. Her language is often linked to cats, saying things like "meow" instead of "me" or "now", "purrfect" instead of "perfect", and "furrocious" instead of "ferocious". She became a gun enthusiast when she was a victim of bullying and suddenly found herself in front of a gun shop. She started to build guns and use them to shoot the bullies with Bb bullets from balconies. When the bullies found out they tortured her with wasps, giving her an acute fear of both stinging insects and buzzing noises.

Pii-tan's "fiancée". They left their homes when their parents tried to break them up, which is later revealed to be because Manbe is already married and Pii-tan is just his mistress. Manbe is always offering to take the burden for or to sacrifice himself for Pii-tan. He and Pii-tan are rarely seen without each other.

A rapper who claims his wife ended their relationship and left him alone. He takes particular interest in the women on the tour. After going after Masaki and pulling her aside. When he goes missing, only Masaki is found, covered in dirt. She claims that he noticed something before running after it and she tripped and fell where they found her. Later Mitsumune claims to see his dead body floating down river, but nothing is found. However, he is later found to be still alive after he was saved by a professor whom he calls "God".  He then reveals that his parents were big in classical music but he had neither talent nor interest, and so turned to rap instead; he came to the village out of frustration as he felt he wasn't successful as a rapper, but managed to leave the village after he accepted that, no matter how successful or unsuccessful he was, he was who he wanted to be.

Joined the tour under the handle of "Pink Goddess". He claims he joined the tour because he became a shell of his former self after he stopped taking care of his parents and was looking to lead a carefree life.

A young boy who claims he has poor health and not long left to live, hoping to do something interesting with his life before he died.

A feminist who ran into sexual harassment and bullying at work and strives to create a world where women can live truly meaningful lives as human beings.

A girl who shared the same online username as Yūna so was given the name Yūne instead.

A woman who shared the same online username as Yūna. She didn't want to have to compete over the name, saying that sort of competitiveness is what made people want to leave societies, so she took the name "Yūno" instead.

Manbe's "fiancée", they ran away from their homes when their parents tried to break them up. She and Manbe are rarely seen without each other. However, her cute personality is just an act and she actually finds Manbe to be incredibly needy and annoying, as she only decided to start a relationship with him to leech of his family's wealth.

A former nurse who claims she's trying to get a fresh start in a new place and find her path.

A woman who joined the tour to get away from a stubborn stalker. The only shoes she packed for the tour were high heels. She is very flirtatious towards the men on the tour, and acts quite carefree all the time.

A girl who claims to be "all dried up" from being in the "Tokyo Desert" and is looking for a better living environment. She only brought vitamins and candy with her.

The representative for the "ISG" ("It's Super Genetic!") organization running the "First Life Do-Over Tour". He tries to keep the group motivated and calm the others when they're fighting. However, his role as one of the tour organizers makes him suspicious. He eventually reveals that his perky personality was just a façade, and the entire reason he organized the trip with Koharun was because he believed she'd have sex with him if he did.

A boy who claims he never felt like he was who he truly is.

A girl looking for love on the tour. She uses the biblical reference of Adam and Eve to describe herself and her future partner. She appears to have been friends with Maimai before the tour and tries to get her to pursue Mitsumune.

A survivalist who takes survival of the fittest seriously. He travels with a large number of expensive survival gear and approaches all things pragmatically. He once attempted to join the JSDF, but failed after he tried to have silicon injected into his scalp to meet the minimum height requirement. In English, his name means "Fire of Hell".

A big guy who likes eating and claims he joined the tour because he was tired of his hum-drum lifestyle. He uses his name as an adjective when speaking.

A member of a yakitori business who accrued massive debts. He wanted to join a world with no foreign currency exchanges. He seems to be a laid back individual.

Others
Driver

The driver of the tour who initially disapproves of the tour member's plans to run away from their lives' problems and preaches to them about his own rough lifestyle and how he has to carry on regardless. Although he hates the tour and his negligent driving nearly gets them killed, he finds his own reason to stay in Nanakimura village when he sees something in the woods. He later claims he is seeing his dead daughter and desires to be with her. Eventually it is revealed that he blamed himself for his daughter's death and is able to leave the village when he accepts that she is gone.

Reiji

Reiji is Masaki's cousin and the reason why she's coming back to Nanakimura. It is revealed that Reiji is actually Masaki's Nanaki and was a character created by Masaki's imagination when she was small to keep her company as a friend.

Media

Anime
The opening theme titled  was sung by Ami Wajima, while the ending theme titled  was sung by Rina Katahira.

Episode list

Manga
A manga adaptation titled  was drawn by Subaru Fuji. It was serialized online on Shogakukan's MangaOne app between April 8, 2016, and November 5, 2016, and has been published by Shogakukan in three tankōbon volumes.

Volume list

Novel
A spin-off novel written by Tsukasa Tsuchiya and illustrated by Kei, titled  features an original story that focuses on Lion and was released on September 17, 2016.

See also
Japanese haunted towns

References

External links
  

Anime with original screenplays
Animeism
Diomedéa
Shogakukan franchises
Shogakukan manga
Shōnen manga
Television shows written by Mari Okada
Wowow original programming